This is a list of electoral results for the electoral district of Nedlands in Western Australian state elections from the district's creation in 1929 until the present.

Members for Nedlands

Election results

Elections in the 2020s

2021

Elections in the 2010s

2017

2013

Elections in the 2000s

2008

2005

2001 by-election

2001

Elections in the 1990s

1996

1993

Elections in the 1980s

1989

1986

1983

1982 by-election

1980

Elections in the 1970s

1977

1974

1971

Elections in the 1960s

1968

1965

1962

Elections in the 1950s

1959

1956

1953

1950

Elections in the 1940s

1947

1943

The Independent candidate at the 1947 election was a member of the Labor Party but did not receive the party's endorsement.

Elections in the 1930s

1939

1936

1933

1930

References

Western Australian state electoral results by district